Shingada Damodar Barku (1 October 1954 – 2 May 2021) was a five-time member of the Lok Sabha in 7th, 8th, 9th, 10th and 14th Lok Sabha of India, representing the Dahanu constituency of Maharashtra state. He was a member of the Indian National Congress (INC) political party.

Career

Corresponding results of elections in the year:
1980: Damodar Shingada, Indian National Congress 
1984: Damodar Shingada, Indian National Congress 
1989: Damodar Shingada, Indian National Congress 
1991: Damodar Shingada, Indian National Congress 
2004: Damodar Shingada, Indian National Congress.

Mr Damodar Shingada has a strong support of a heavyweight politician from Dahanu Rd named Shashikant Bari (Ex-Mayor of Dahanu).

Mr Shingada lost the Lok Sabha election 2009 to an Independent candidate Baliram Jadhav.

The reasons for loss have been reported as:
1) Virar-Vasai belt MLA Hitendra Thakur putting his weight behind Baliram Jadhav, due to internal differences with Shingada,
2) The Delimitation process, which made Shingada lose his votebank to the neighbouring constituency,
3) Also, the Nationalist Congress Party workers not extending full support to Mr Shingada, even though there was a tie up between the INC and NCP at national level.

Later, Baliram Jadhav extended his conditional support to the INC at the centre, and demanded the establishment of Vasai-Virar Municipal corporation.

Ashok Chavan, the chief minister of Maharashtra, gained the support of Baliram Jadhav with the consent of Damodar Shingada.

References 

 profile Lok Sabha website

1954 births
2021 deaths
Indian National Congress politicians
Marathi politicians
India MPs 2004–2009
India MPs 1991–1996
India MPs 1989–1991
India MPs 1984–1989
India MPs 1980–1984
People from Palghar district
Lok Sabha members from Maharashtra
Deaths from the COVID-19 pandemic in India